Julian Wright is Professor of History and Head of Humanities at Northumbria University and Secretary for Professional Engagement at the Royal Historical Society. 
He was previously a senior lecturer in history at the University of Durham and earlier a Junior Research Fellow of Christ Church, Oxford.

He is a historian of modern culture, politics and ideas, and has worked in particular on ideas and experiences of time in modern Europe; on the social history of intellectuals and politicians in France; and on historiography.

Between 2007 and 2022 he was Musical Director of The Durham Singers.

He is the elder son of the theologian and former Bishop of Durham N. T. Wright

Bibliography
The Regionalist Movement in France, 1890-1914: Jean Charles-Brun and French Political Thought (Oxford University Press, 2003)
Socialism and the Experience of Time: Idealism and the Present in Modern France (Oxford University Press, 2017)

References

External links
 

Academics of Durham University
Historians of France
British historians
Academic journal editors
Living people
1974 births